Maer is a civil parish in the district of Newcastle-under-Lyme, Staffordshire, England.  It contains 27 buildings that are recorded in the National Heritage List for England.  Of these, three are listed at Grade II*, the middle of the three grades, and the others are at Grade II, the lowest grade.  The parish contains the villages of Maer and Aston, and the surrounding countryside.  Most of the listed buildings are houses, cottages, farmhouses and farm buildings.  In the parish is a country house, Maer Hall, and another large house, Lea Head Manor, both of which are listed, together with associated structures.  The other listed buildings are a church, memorials in the churchyard, and five mileposts.


Key

Buildings

References

Citations

Sources

Lists of listed buildings in Staffordshire
Borough of Newcastle-under-Lyme